Rafik Yakubov (born September 14, 1966) is a Russian and Soviet former professional ice hockey defenceman, who played for the Russia II (Izvestia Trophy 1993) and the first national team of Russia (Deutschland Cup 1993). After completing his playing career, he became a coach and general manager.

Awards and honors

References

External links
Biographical information and career statistics from Eliteprospects.com, or The Internet Hockey Database

1966 births
Living people
Ak Bars Kazan players
HC Lada Togliatti players
HC Neftekhimik Nizhnekamsk players
Russian ice hockey defencemen